D6 is a state road in central parts of Croatia connecting Jurovski Brod border crossing to Slovenia and Dvor border crossing to Bosnia and Herzegovina via Karlovac, Vojnić, Glina and Dvor. The road also serves as a connection to the A1 motorway Karlovac interchange via the D1 state road in Karlovac.

The road, as well as all other state roads in Croatia, is managed and maintained by Hrvatske ceste, a state-owned company.

Traffic volume 

Traffic is regularly counted and reported by Hrvatske ceste, operator of the road.

Road junctions and populated areas

Maps

Sources

D006
D006
D006